Ulick Burke, Bourk or Burgh is the name of:

 Ulick Burke of Umhaill (died 1343), founder of the Bourkes of the Owles
 Uilleag de Burgh or Sir Ulick Burke, 1st Clanricarde or Mac William Uachtar (d.1343 or 1353), Irish chieftain and noble
 Ulick an Fhiona Burke, 3rd Clanricarde or Mac William Uachtar (d. 1424), Irish chieftain and noble
 Ulick Ruadh Burke, 5th Clanricarde or Mac William Uachtar (d. 1485), Irish chieftain and noble
 Ulick Fionn Burke, 6th Clanricarde or Mac William Uachtar (d. 1509), Irish chieftain and noble
 Ulick Óge Burke, 8th Clanricarde or Mac William Uachtar (d. 1520), Irish chieftain and noble
 Ulick na gCeann Burke, 1st Earl of Clanricarde and 12th Clanricarde or Mac William Uachtar (d. 1544), Irish noble
 Ulick Burke, 3rd Earl of Clanricarde, 3rd Earl of Clanricarde (d. 1601), Irish peer
 Ulick Burke, 1st Marquess of Clanricarde or Ulick MacRichard Burke (1604–1657), Anglo-Irish nobleman
 Ulick Burke, 1st Viscount Galway (c. 1670–1691), Irish peer and army officer
 Sir Ulick Burke, 3rd Baronet (died 1708), of Glinsk, MP for Galway County
 Ulick Canning de Burgh, Lord Dunkellin (1827–1867), Anglo-Irish soldier and politician
 Ulick de Burgh, 1st Marquess of Clanricarde (1802–1874), British whig politician
 Ulick Burke (politician), Irish Fine Gael politician
 Peter Burke (historian), or Ulick Peter Burke, British historian
 Sir Ulick Burke, 1st Baronet (c. 1594–c. 1660) of the Burke Baronets
 Sir Ulick Burke, 8th Baronet (d. 1759) of the Burke Baronets

See also
 de Burgh
Burke (surname)

House of Burgh